Pre-war Československá zbrojovka, akc.spol. (or a.s.) (Czechoslovak Armory)and post-war Zbrojovka Brno, n.p.(Brno Armory) was a maker of small arms, light artillery, and motor vehicles in Brno, Czechoslovakia. It also made other products and tools, such as typewriters and early computers.

In 1946, Zbrojovka started making tractors, which it branded "Zetor" ("Z-tractor"). Zetor continues to make tractors in Brno.

History
The company was founded in 1918 as a state-owned factory known as the State Armament and Engineering Works. The factory assembled German Gewehr 98 and Austrian Mannlicher M1895 rifles, but later began producing their own. In 1924–1925 a new factory was built, where cars, engines and other machines were produced in addition to rifles and machine guns. In the 1930s, the factory also produced Remington licensed typewriters and Skoda tractors.

During the German occupation of Czechoslovakia, Zbrojovka Brno was renamed to Waffenwerke Brunn and produced weapons for the Wehrmacht and the Waffen-SS. In 1944, the factory was severely damaged in the bombing of Brno. After liberation and rebuilding, it resumed production. In the second half of the 1940s, it produced engines, weapons and tractors. In November 1945, a prototype of the Zetor Z-25 tractor was produced, the name Zetor, which was maintained to this day, comes from the words "Zet" (the proclaimed first letter of the armory) and "or" (the end of the word tractor).

In the 1980s, the company refocused mainly on communication and computing technologies at the expense of weapons production and repair. In the 1990s, the number of employees began to decrease. 

From 2003, the company continued to decline; in June 2006, arms production was discontinued. On 8 August 2006, the last employees were made redundant. Shortly after, at the beginning of September 2006, Zbrojovka Brno auctioned machine equipment at public auction. The machines were purchased by Česká zbrojovka Uherský Brod, another firearms manufacturing company. The 22.5 hectare premises in Brno were auctioned at the end of January 2008 for  707 million CZK (30 million US Dollars, 24 million GBP, 25 million €) by the Slovak holding company J&T. Now the campus is used by several companies; due to the aesthetics of the premises, it is used for photographic work. There are also music rehearsal rooms. The lease agreement between Zbrojvka Brno and the new owner has been extended and is continuing production in rented premises.

Products

Firearms

vz. 98/22
ZB vz. 26
vz. 24
ZH-29
Karabiner 98k (German occupation of Czechoslovakia)
Gewehr 33/40 (German occupation of Czechoslovakia)
MG 34 (German occupation of Czechoslovakia)
ZB-53
ZB-47
ZB-50
ZB-530
BRNO MOD2-E
ZK-383

Motor vehicles

Zbrojovka built cars and light commercial vehicles with two-stroke engines. The first model was the Disk, which was a two-door light car with a four-cylinder, 598cc,  engine launched in 1924. This was succeeded in 1926 by the Z 18, which was a two-door sedan powered by a two-cylinder, 1005 cc engine producing . This was succeeded in 1929 by the Z 9, which had a 993cc engine producing . Body options for the Z 9 included a four-door sedan or convertible, two-door, four-seat sedan, two-seat convertible and a commercial light truck.

In 1933, Zbrojovka introduced the Z 4, again with a two-cylinder engine. Early versions displaced  and produced .

In 1935, Zbrojovka widened its range with two new models, the Z 6 Hurvínek and Z 5 Express. The Z 6 had a two-cylinder engine that displaced  and produced . The Z 5 engine was modular with the Z 6: a four-cylinder version that displaced  and produced . Zbrojovka designed a rakish new body style for the Z 5 and Z 6 and updated the Z 4 body to a similar style.

Zbrojovka ceased production of the Z4 and Z5 in 1936 and the Z6 in 1937. After the Second World War the company concentrated its vehicle manufacturing on tractors.

References

Bibliography

External links

 

1918 establishments in Czechoslovakia
Car manufacturers of the Czech Republic
Firearm manufacturers of the Czech Republic
History of Brno
Vehicle manufacturing companies established in 1918
Manufacturing companies of the Czech Republic
Motor vehicle manufacturers of Czechoslovakia